"Out in the Fields" is a song by Irish musicians Gary Moore and Phil Lynott, who had previously been bandmates in Thin Lizzy. Written by Moore and released as a single in 1985, the song was also featured on his album Run for Cover in the same year. It is about the Troubles in Northern Ireland.

The song performed well commercially, reaching No.3 in the Irish Singles Chart and No.5 on the UK Singles Chart, making it the highest-charting single for both of the performers. "Out in the Fields" was also one of the last recordings made by Phil Lynott before his death on 4 January 1986.

Track listings
7" vinyl

7" vinyl double pack (limited edition)
 UK: 10 Records / TEN 49

12" vinyl

Personnel 
 Out in the Fields
 Gary Moore – guitars, lead vocals
 Phil Lynott – lead vocals, bass
 Andy Richards – keyboards
 Don Airey – keyboards
 Charlie Morgan – drums and electronic drums

Chart performance

Cover versions
The song has been covered by multiple artists, including    Riot (on The Brethren of the Long House, 1996), Dark at Dawn (on Crimson Frost, 2001), Michael Schenker Group (on Heavy Hitters, 2005), Supreme Majesty (on Elements of Creation, 2005), Primal Fear (on Metal Is Forever - The Very Best of Primal Fear, 2006), Sonata Arctica (as the B-side to "Paid in Full", 2007), Timo Kotipelto & Jani Liimatainen (on Blackoustic, 2012), Iron Mask (on V/A - Give Us Moore!: A Tribute to Gary Moore, 2004), Powerwolf (on Metallum Nostrum, bonus disc to Blessed & Possessed, 2015), Black Majesty (on Cross of Thorns, 2015) and Mono Inc. (on Together Till the End, 2017),  KiXX (band), 2020

References

1985 singles
Songs written by Gary Moore
Gary Moore songs
Phil Lynott songs
British heavy metal songs
Song recordings produced by Peter Collins (record producer)
Songs about The Troubles (Northern Ireland)
1985 songs